Thiri Yaza Dewi was a principal queen consort of King Nanda of Toungoo Dynasty of Myanmar (Burma) from 1583 to 1599. The youngest daughter of Viceroy Minkhaung II of Toungoo, along with her two sisters Min Phyu and Min Htwe, married her first cousin Nanda in 1583. The marriages of state solidified the ties between Minkhaung II and Nanda, the High King. At Pegu (Bago), she became the Queen of the Northern Palace.

The queen lost her office in 1599 when Nanda surrendered to the forces of her brother Minye Thihathu II of Toungoo and Raza II of Mrauk-U. She was part of the defeated royal family that was brought back to her native Toungoo (Taungoo) in 1600. She became a widow on 30 November 1600 when her nephew Natshinnaung assassinated Nanda. On 21 November 1602, Minye Thihathu II married her off to his third son (and her nephew) Minye Thihathu III of Toungoo, who was at least 20 years, perhaps even 25 years, her junior. On the same day, her only daughter Min Shwe-Don was married to her nephew (and her new husband's younger brother) Minye Kyawhtin II of Kawliya.

She apparently died sometime in the next eight years.

Ancestry
The queen was descended from the Prome and ultimately Ava royalty from her mother's side. Her father Minkhaung was a half-brother of King Bayinnaung. Her personal name was Min Pu.

Notes

References

Bibliography
 
 

Queens consort of Toungoo dynasty
1550s births
1600s deaths
16th-century Burmese women
17th-century Burmese women